= Chairman Kim =

Chairman Kim may refer to:

- Kim Il Sung (1912–1994), former General Secretary of the Workers' Party of Korea and Chairman of the Workers' Party of Korea (1949–1966)
- Kim Jong Il (1941–2011), former General Secretary of the Workers' Party of Korea and Chairman of the National Defence Commission (1993–2011)
- Kim Jong Un (1984– ), current General Secretary of the Workers' Party of Korea and Chairman of the Central Military Commission
